Duodenibacillus is a Gram-negative genus of bacteria from the family of Sutterellaceae with one known species (Duodenibacillus massiliensis).Duodenibacillus massiliensis has been isolated from the human duodenum.

References

Burkholderiales
Bacteria genera
Monotypic bacteria genera